William Ward (24 July 1787 – 30 June 1849) was an English financier, and noted cricketer.

Life
Born at Highbury Place, Islington, 24 July 1787, he was the second son of George Ward (died 1829), of Northwood Park, Cowes, a London merchant and large landowner in the Isle of Wight and Hampshire, by his wife Mary (died 1813), daughter of Henry Sampson Woodfall. Robert Plumer Ward was his uncle. He was educated at Winchester College.

Ward was destined for commerce, and spent some time at Antwerp in a banking-house. On his return his father took him into partnership in 1810. In 1817 he was elected a director of the Bank of England, known as an expert on foreign exchanges. In 1819 he gave evidence before the parliamentary committees on the restrictions on payments in cash by the Bank of England.

On 9 June 1826 he became Member of Parliament in the Tory interest for the City of London, and in 1830 at the request of the Duke of Wellington, he acted as chairman of the committee appointed to investigate the affairs of the East India Company, before the opening of the China trade. In 1831, discontented at the spirit of reform, he declined to stand for parliament. In 1835 he presented himself as a candidate, and was defeated by the Whigs; and retired from public life.

Ward died on 30 June 1849 in London at Wyndham Place.

Cricketing career
William Ward was a prominent right-handed batsman and an occasional slow lob bowler. His first-class career began in the 1810 English cricket season but it was interrupted by the Napoleonic War until 1816. Ward played until 1845.

His score of 278 for the Marylebone Cricket Club (MCC) v Norfolk at Lord's in 1820 was the highest individual innings in first-class cricket until W. G. Grace scored first-class cricket's first triple-century in August 1876, more than 27 years after Ward's death. The ball used is thought to be the oldest in existence and is kept in the MCC Museum.

In 1825 Thomas Lord was negotiating the sale of his cricket ground as a building estate when Ward stepped in and saved Lord's for cricket. The price was £5000. He was celebrated in the following anonymous poem.

And of all who frequent the ground named after Lord,
On the list first and foremost should stand Mr Ward.
No man will deny, I am sure, when I say
That he's without rival first bat of the day,
And although he has grown a little too stout,
Even Matthews is bothered at bowling him out.
He's our life blood and soul in this noblest of games,
And yet on our praises he's many more claims;
No pride, although rich, condescending and free,
And a well informed man and a city M.P.

John Nyren dedicated his famous book The Young Cricketer's Tutor to Ward when it appeared in 1833. He described Ward as "the most worthy man of the day to reflect credit upon my choice as a patron".

More recently, Ward was mentioned in The Duckworth Lewis Method's song, "Gentlemen and Players".
A bored young William Ward MP.
Bought Lord's from Thomas Lord
In eighteen twenty five.

The lyric is slightly inaccurate since Ward did not become an MP until 1826.

Works
In 1847 Ward published Remarks on the Monetary Legislation of Great Britain (London), in which he condemned the act of 1816 establishing an exclusive gold standard, and called for a bi-metallic currency.

Family
On 26 April 1811 he married Emily, fifth daughter of Harvey Christian Combe, a London alderman. She died on 24 September 1848, leaving four sons – William George Ward, Henry Ward, Matthew Ward, and Arthur Ward – and two daughters.

References

Attribution:

External links
 

English cricketers
English cricketers of 1787 to 1825
English cricketers of 1826 to 1863
Gentlemen cricketers
Hampshire cricketers
Marylebone Cricket Club cricketers
1787 births
1849 deaths
North v South cricketers
People educated at Winchester College
People associated with the Bank of England
Members of the Parliament of the United Kingdom for English constituencies
UK MPs 1826–1830
UK MPs 1830–1831
Surrey cricketers
Tory MPs (pre-1834)
Left-Handed v Right-Handed cricketers
Married v Single cricketers
Epsom cricketers
Godalming Cricket Club cricketers
Gentlemen of England cricketers
A to K v L to Z cricketers
Old Wykehamists cricketers
Non-international England cricketers
St John's Wood cricketers
Fast v Slow cricketers
William Ward's XI cricketers
George Osbaldeston's XI cricketers
19th-century British businesspeople
Marylebone Cricket Club Second 10 with 1 Other cricketers
Marylebone Cricket Club Second 9 with 3 Others cricketers
Lord Strathavon's XI cricketers